Banton Gallitin Boone (October 23, 1838 - February 11, 1900) was a Democratic Party politician and lawyer from Missouri. He was Speaker of the Missouri House of Representatives from 1875 to 1877, and Missouri Attorney General from 1885 to 1889.

Boone was a descendant of Daniel Boone. He was born in Callaway County and moved to Clinton in Henry County, where he became Deputy County Clerk in 1856. He was admitted to the bar in 1860. He fought for the Confederacy in the Civil War.

References

1838 births
1900 deaths
19th-century American politicians
Missouri Attorneys General
Speakers of the Missouri House of Representatives
Democratic Party members of the Missouri House of Representatives
People from Callaway County, Missouri
People from Clinton, Missouri
Boone family (pioneers)
Confederate States Army soldiers